Vovray-en-Bornes is a commune in the Haute-Savoie department in the Auvergne-Rhône-Alpes region in south-eastern France.

It sits on the eastern flank of Salève, near the river Usses. It is located on the D15 route, 25 km south of Geneva, 25 km north of Annecy and 20 km west of Bonneville.

This alpine community has 334 inhabitants, spread between Vovray itself and the hamlets of Rogin, la Mouille, Le Vernet, Le Château, Sallanjoux, plus the farmsteads of Body, Vardon, and Quétand.

The village is a centre of dairy farming, producing reblochon cheese through the Mont Salève de Cruseilles co-operative. 
Vovray also has two former silica quarries.

See also
Communes of the Haute-Savoie department

References

Communes of Haute-Savoie